Karl Hermann Martell (November 17, 1906 in Tilsit – December 28, 1966 in Hamburg) was a German actor.

Martell was only 14 when he had his first performance in a silent movie, Das große Geheimnis (1920). In subsequent years, he was often seen as a supporting actor. In the 1930s, he reached main billing in romance and adventure films and acted as a partner of Zarah Leander in four movies. During World War II he participated in  Alarm, Ohm Krüger, Back Then and Das alte Lied.

After the Second World War, in the 1950s, Martell tried to resume his movie career, but he was given mainly B-movie roles. He also produced documentaries. In his last film, The Blue Moth (1959), he again appeared with Zarah Leander, albeit in a minor role.

Filmography 

 1920: Das grosse Geheimnis
 1921: The Golden Plague
 1922: Das goldene Haar
 1936: Der Zweck heiligt die Mittel
 1937: Dangerous Game
 1937: Crooks in Tails
 1937: Premiere
 1937: La Habanera
 1938: The Gambler
 1938: Women for Golden Hill
 1939: D III 88
 1939: Dein Leben gehört mir
 1939: Silvesternacht am Alexanderplatz
 1939: Die Geliebte
 1941:  Alarm
 1941: Ohm Krüger
 1942: With the Eyes of a Woman 
 1943: I Pagliacci
 1943: Lache Bajazzo
 1943: Back Then
 1945: Das alte Lied
 1945: Zwischen Herz und Gewissen
 1945: Das fremde Leben
 1951: Herzen im Sturm
 1951: Mathematik der Schönheit (director)
 1953: Seenot...---...SOS (director)
 1953: Stars Over Colombo
 1954: The Prisoner of the Maharaja
 1959: The Blue Moth

References
 The first version of this entry is a partial translation of the corresponding German website from 1/21/2008.

External links
 
 Karl Martell in zarah-leander.de
 Biographie (fr.)

1906 births
1966 deaths
German male film actors
People from Tilsit
People from East Prussia
20th-century German male actors